The 75th All-Japan Artistic Gymnastics Championships was held on 3 occasions. The individual all-around took place from 15-18 April, followed by the apparatus finals on 5-6 June, and finally the team all-around from 11-12 December.

Takasaki hosted all the individual events, both all-around and apparatus, while the team competition was held in Yoyogi National Gymnasium in Shibuya, Tokyo. The tournaments also served as the national trials for the 2020 Summer Olympics, with the participation of over 170 gymnasts nationwide.

Qualification

Men's Events

Individual All-around 
The maximum of 90 male gymnasts would be qualified to compete for the men's individual all-around event, following these criterion:
 2020 All Japan Artistic Gymnastics Championships top ranks: 44 gymnasts.
 National Tryout (tournament 3): 18 gymnasts.
 Men's Junior Strengthening Department recommendation: 5 gymnasts.
 Japan Gymnastics Association recommendation: 5 gymnasts.
 2021 Summer Universiade shortlist: 18 gymnasts.
 53rd All Japan Senior Gymnastics Championships top team: 6 slots.
 Gakuren recommendation: 12 gymnasts.

Individual Apparatus 
The maximum of 24 male gymnasts would be qualified to compete for the men's individual all-around event, following these criteria:

① Winner of 2020 event and the gymnast selected to represent Japan at the World Cup in Doha; or top 2 of 2020 event.

② Top 22-24 gymnasts (not included in ①) all-around qualifying and tryout results to make the maximum of 24.

③ 2 spot for team contribution based on the results up to the NHK Trophy among the players who met the B-selection conditions (NHK Trophy 10th place or less, best team member, world ranking 1st-place winner). This 2 gymnast who didn't passed the All-Japan event-specific qualifying were allowed to perform (but wouldn't advance to the final)

• Selected athletes for ③ were allowed perform, but the results wouldn't be in the eventual ranking.

• The selection of qualification ③ was announced after the end of the NHK Trophy.

Team All-around 
16 male gymnastics clubs qualified for the team final following these criteria:
 12 teams with the highest scores at the competitions below:
 75th All Japan Student Championships (1st division)
 75th All Japan Student Championships (2nd division)
 54th All Japan Senior Gymnastics Championships (1st division)
 Top 2 teams of the 2021 All-Japan Junior Championships.
 1 team with the highest score at the 2021 National High School Championships that hadn't qualified yet.
 1 Junior National Selection team.

Schedule

Medal summary

Men

Women

See also 
 2021 in artistic gymnastics
 Japan men's national gymnastics team

References 

National artistic gymnastics competitions
2021 in gymnastics
2021 in Japanese sport
April 2021 sports events in Japan
December 2021 sports events in Japan
Gymnastics competitions in Japan